New Dykes Brow was an early, short lived railway station near Fingland, Cumbria on the Carlisle & Silloth Bay Railway & Dock Company's branch from  to 

The station served the small hamlet of Fingland and its rural surrounds, though its name is unclear from this distance in time.

Its timetable entries show trains calling on Saturdays only (Market Day). It only appeared in public timetables from November 1856 to October 1866.

In 1866 no evidence of the station could be seen on OS maps,. It is possible that this was a "use it or lose it" stopping place where no platforms were built.

The line through the station site closed on 7 September 1964.

History 
The North British Railway (NBR) leased the line from the Carlisle & Silloth Bay Railway & Dock Company in 1862, and absorbed them in 1880, The NBR, in turn, was absorbed into the London and North Eastern Railway in 1923, passing to British Railways in 1948.

References

Sources

External links
 The line with period photographs, via Holme St Cuthbert History Group
 Cumbria Gazetteer
 The station site on an Edwardian 6" OS map, via National Library of Scotland
 The station via Rail Maps Online

Disused railway stations in Cumbria
Railway stations in Great Britain opened in 1856
Railway stations in Great Britain closed in 1866
1856 establishments in England